The following is an incomplete list of South American stadiums. They are ordered by their total capacity, that is the maximum number of spectators the stadium can accommodate (all-seater). Stadiums with a capacity of 30,000 or more are included.

Most large stadiums in South America are used for association football, with some having running tracks for athletics.

List

Argentina below 30,000 capacity

Argentina below 30,000 capacity indoor stadiums

Bolivia below 30,000 capacity

Bolivia below 30,000 capacity indoor stadiums

Brazil below 30,000 capacity

Brazil below 30,000 capacity indoor stadiums

Chile below 30,000 capacity

Chile below 30,000 capacity indoor stadiums

Colombia below 30,000 capacity

Colombia below 30,000 capacity indoor stadiums

Ecuador below 30,000 capacity

Ecuador below 30,000 capacity indoor stadiums

Guyana below 30,000 capacity

Paraguay below 30,000 capacity

Peru below 30,000 capacity

Peru below 30,000 capacity indoor stadiums

Uruguay below 30,000 capacity

Venezuela below 30,000 capacity

Venezuela below 30,000 capacity indoor stadiums

See also

Lists of stadiums by continent

List of African stadiums by capacity
List of Asian stadiums by capacity
List of European stadiums by capacity
List of North American stadiums by capacity
List of Oceanian stadiums by capacity

Lists of stadiums worldwide

 List of association football stadiums by capacity
 List of association football stadiums by country
 List of athletics stadiums
 List of baseball stadiums by capacity
 List of basketball arenas
 List of bullrings by capacity
 List of closed stadiums by capacity
 List of covered stadiums by capacity
 List of cricket grounds by capacity
 List of future stadiums
 List of indoor arenas
 List of indoor arenas by capacity
 List of rugby league stadiums by capacity
 List of rugby union stadiums by capacity
 List of sporting venues with a highest attendance of 100,000 or more
 List of sports venues by capacity
 List of stadiums by capacity
 List of tennis stadiums by capacity

Lists of stadiums by South American country

List of football stadiums in Argentina
List of indoor arenas in Argentina
List of football stadiums in Bolivia
List of football stadiums in Brazil
List of indoor arenas in Brazil
List of football stadiums in Chile
List of football stadiums in Colombia
List of football stadiums in Ecuador
List of football stadiums in Guyana
List of football stadiums in Paraguay
List of football stadiums in Peru
List of football stadiums in Uruguay
List of baseball stadiums in Venezuela
List of football stadiums in Venezuela

Other

List of stadiums in South America
List of attendance figures at domestic professional sports leagues
List of professional sports leagues by revenue

Notes

References

External links
cafe.daum.net/stade
www.fussballtempel.net ]

Stadiums
Lists of stadiums
Stadiums
Lists of sports venues with capacity
Stadiums, capacity